The following is a list of Romansh exonyms, that is to say Romansh-language names for towns and cities that do not speak Romansh.

Australia

Austria

Czechia

Germany

Italy

Poland

Portugal

Switzerland

Aare L'Ara / Aara // Arola (ital)
Acht Alte Orte Otg Chantuns vegls
Acqua Marcia or Acqua marza \ Ava Martscha
Agren Pass da la Greina 
Albula -(river) Alvra
Albula Hospiz Ospizi Alvra, Ospiz Alvra
Albula Pass Pass da l'Alvra
Albulatal Val d'Alvra
Albulatal and Ober-und Unterhalbstein Surmeir
Alpenrhein Rain Alpin
Alpen Alps
Alp Weissenstein Alp Crap Alv
Alt Fry Rätien Rezia veglia (hist.)
Amselbrunnen Funtauna Merla / Fontana Merla
Ob-Fontana Marla Sur-Funtauna Merla
Unter-Fontana Merla Suot-Funtauna Merla
Aroser Rothorn Piz Cotschen
Averserrhein or Averser Bach Rain d'Avras
Aversertal Val d'Avras
Belfort Belfort (reg)
Ausser-Belfort Belfort Dadora
Inner-Belfort Belfort Dadens
Bergünerstein Crap da Bravuogn
Bergüner Stöcke Pizs da Bravuogn
Bernhardinpass Pass dal Bernardin
Berninahäuser Bernina Suot / Bernina sut
Berninapass Pass dal Bernina
Berninatal Val Bernina
Bianco or  Piz Bianco Piz Alv
Bifertenstock Piz Durschin
Bregaglia Bergiaglia or Bregaglia 
Breite Krone Curuna Lada
Bündner-Alpen Alps Grischunas
Bündner Rheintal Val sut dal Rain
Bündner Tödi Tödi Grischun
Calancatal Val Calanca [rr]/(ital)
Camogaskertal Val Chamuera
Casannatal Val Chaschauna
Chlein Ducan Ducan Pitschen
Chli Tödi Crap Glaruna
Chli Ross Chavagl Pitschen
Churer Rheintal Val dal Rain grischuna
Churrätien Currezia (hist.)
Cima dei Rossi Russa
Cima la Casina Piz Murtaröl
Cima Garibaldi Piz da las trais Linguas
Cimalmotta Piz Miez
Corno dei Marci Corn di Marsc
Corno di Campo Corn da Camp
Corno di Vallüglia Corn dal Solcun
Disentis [Kreis Disentis] Cadi or (circul da la Cadi) (region)
Domleschg Tumleastga or Tumliastga / Domliaschga (old) \\ Tomigliasca / Domigliasca (ital)
Ausser-Domleschg Tumleastga Dadora
Inner-Domleschg Tumleastga Dadens
Engadin Engiadina / Giadina, Nagiadegna, Gidegna
Oberengadin Engiadin'Ota or Engiadin'aulta / Engiadina Sura
Unterengadin Engiadina bassa 
Fedenstock Piz Sumval
Feistenberg Val Buera
Fextal or Feextal Val Fex or Val Fed
Fimberferner Vadret da Fenga
Fimberpass Pass dal Fenga, Cuolmen da Fenga, Fuorcla da Fenga
Fimbertal Val Fenga
Flimserstein Crap da Flem
Flimserwald Guaud da Flem
Flix Flex
Flüelapass Pass dal Flüela, / Vallula / Flögia / Fleia
Fluchthorn Piz Fenga
Forcola di Livigno Fuorcla da Livign
Freie Ämter Contadis libers
Fünf Dörfer Tschintg Vitgs
Furche or Furgge rr. Fuorcla / it. Forcola
Furkapass Furca
Gelbhorn Piz Mellen
Gemspleisspitze Paraid Naira
Glaspass Tavellas
Glenner Glogn or Gliong
Gotthard-Sankt Gotthard Pass Pass dal Son Gottard / -[Munt Avellin] 
Grauhörner Pizzas d'Anarosa
Grenzeckkopf Piz Faschalba
Gross Düssi Piz Git, Piz Valgronda
Gross Ross Chavagl Grond
Gruob Foppa
Güner Horn Piz Gün
Hahnengrat Igls Cuetschens
Hausstock Piz Fluatsch
Heinzenberg Mantogna or Muntogna \\ Montagna (ital)
Ausserheinzenberg Mantogna Dadora (hist.)
Innerheinzenberg Mantogna Dadens (hist.)
Oberheinzenberg Mantogna Sura (hist.)
Unterheinzenberg Mantogna Sut (hist.)
Herrschaft Signuradi / Signeradi / Segneradi / Contadi 
Hinterrhein Rain Posteriur
Hinterrheintal Val dal Rain Posteriur 
Hochrhein Rain Aut
Hohenrätien Rezia aulta, Reziòlta, Realta / Munt Son Gion (hist.)
Hohle Gasse Giaffa chiavorgia
Imboden Il Plaun / Plan / il Pleun / Plaun
Inn En / Oen 
Jaunpass Pass dal Jaun
Jörgenberg Munt Sogn Gieri
Juff Piz Tiarms
Julia Güglia, Gelgia
Julier Hospiz Ospizi dal Güglia, La Veduta
Kämertal Val Val
Karlstal Val S-charl
Kistenpass Pass dal Lembra
Kistenstöckli Muot da Rubi
Kunkelpass Pass dal Cunclas
Landquart Languart 
Lanzer Horn Pizza da Lantsch
Limmeralp Lembra
Lugnez  Lumnezia or Lumneztga, Lungnetza / Lumnezza 
Lukmanierpass Cuolm Lucmagn or Pass dil Lucmagn / Cuolm da Sontga Maria, Pass dal Lucmagn 
Maderanertal Val Maderana or Val dal Fier
Madriserrhein Aua da Madris 
Madrisertal Val Madris 
Maloja Malögia or Malöggia
Malojapass Pass dal Malögia
Marscholhorn Piz Moesola
Medelserrhein Froda, Rain da Medel
Meuss or Möss / Meis Moesa
Monte Breva Piz la Stretta
Monte Cornaccia Piz Tea Fondada
Mosoxtal Val Mesauc \ Val Mesaug \ Val Moësa \ Mesauc  \ Moesa
Mittelbünden Grischun Central / Sotselva / Sutselva \\ Sottoselva (ital)
Sotmeir \\ - Schynschlucht-[Albulatal] and Domleschg
Surmeir \\ - Schin or Schyn [dt] \\ Meir / Muras / Mir / Miras:
Oberhalbstein Surses or Surset / Sursaissa romontscha / Val Surses / Crap Ses
Unterhalbstein Sotses
Münstertal Val Müstair 
Murettopass Pass dal Müret
Niederrätien or Unterrätien Rezia Inferiura or Rezia Sut (hist.)
Nolla Anugl
Nufenenpass Pass da Nueinas
Oberalppass or Oberalp Cuolm d'Ursera / Alpsu / Crispalt
Oberhalbstein Surses / Surset
Oberland Surselva / Part sura 
Oberrätien Rezia Superiura (hist.)
Oberrhein Rain Superiur
Obersaxen Sursaissa
Ofenpass Pass dal Fuorn
Panixerpass Pass da Pigniu or Pass dil Veptga
Pass Umbrail Fuorcla d'Umbrail
Passo Muretto Cuolm dal Müret
Passo di Val Viola Pass da Val Viola
Pazola Stock Piz Nurschallas
Piz Aela Piz Ela
Piz Casana Piz Chaschauna
Piz Kesch Piz d'Es-cha
Piz Julier Piz Güglia
Piz Scherboden Piz Darlun
Pizzo Combolo Piz Combul
Pizzo Confine Piz Cunfin
Pizzo d'Emet Piz Timun
Pizzo di Güida Piz Güda
Pizzo Leverone Piz Lavirun
Pizzo Paradisino Piz Paradisin
Planggenhorn Crap Grisch
Plangghorn Piz Radund
Plessur Plessur (District Plessur)
Portgerenstock Piz Purtgera
Prättigau Partenz, Val Partens / Partenza / Purtenza / Purtenz / Val Partenz 
Hinterprättigau Partenz davos
Mittelprättigau Partenz Central
Vorderprättigau Partenz Anteriur
Präzer Höhe Mutta da Preaz
Puschlavtal Val Puschlev 
Rambach Rom
Rätien Rezia (hist.)
Rätikon Reticon 
Rhein -(river) Rain or Rein / Ragn
Rheinfall Cascada dal Rain
Rheinwald = [Hinterrheintal] Valragn or Valrain 
Rheinwaldhorn Piz Valragn (hist.)
Riedberg Rapertg
Ringelspitz Piz Bargias
Rossbodenstock Plaunc'aulta
Rotstock Crap Tgietschen
Safiental Val Stussavgia 
Safierberg Piz Calandari
Samnauer Joch Fuorcla Zeblas
Samnauntal Val Samignun 
Sankt Luzi-Steig or Luziensteig Son Gliezi or Pass da Son Gliezi
Scalettapass Cuolm S-chaletta
Schams Schons or Schoms
Schamserberg Muntogna da Schons
Schamsertal Val Schons
Schafberg (Switzerland) Munt da la Bês-cha or Piz Minschuns
Schanfigg Scanvetg 
Schellenberg Piz S-chalambert
Schergenbach Tschera, Tscher
Schiedberg [Sagogn] Crest Val-Casti
Schwarzberg (Lepontine Alps)  Piz Nair
Segnespass Pass dal Segnas
Selbsanft Grepliun
Septimerpass Pass da Sett or Pass dal Set
Setherfurka Fuorcla da Siat
Silenental Val Silauna
Silsersee Lai da Segl
Somvixertal Val Sumvitg or Val Tinigia
Splügenpass Pass dal Spleia
Stammerspitz Piz Tschütta
Stätzer Horn Piz Raschil
Stierlerjoch Fuorcla Starlex
Stierlerspitze Piz Starlex
Stilfserjoch Pass da Stielva 
Strelapass Pass da la Striera
Stulsergrat Filda Stugl
Suisse romande Svizra romanda / Svizra franzosa
Surenstock Piz Sardona
Schwarzhorn Piz Gren
Segantinihütte Chamanna Segantini
Obtasna Sur Tasna
Untertasna Suot-Tasna or Sot-Tasna
Urner Alpen Alps uranaisas
Urseren Val d'Ursera
Taminatal Val Tamina
Tavetschertal Val Tujetsch
Teufelsbrücke Punt dal Diavel
Tinzenhorn Corn da Tinizong
Tödi Piz Russein
Tomülpass Pass da Tumegl
Trinserhorn Piz Dolf
Tristelhorn Piz da Sterls
Tschingelhoren Dunschalas \ Siat Soras
Urtiolaspitze Piz Terza
Valle di Blenio or Val da Blegn 
Val Mesolcina Val Mesauc
Vals Val Sogn Pieder or Val San Pieder / Val Son Peder
Valserberg Cuolm Val (hist.)
Vereinapass Pass dal Veraina / Fuorcla Zodrel
Vesilspitze Piz Rots
Vetta Sprella Piz Sena
Viamala or Via Mala (Veia Mala)
Vier Dörfer Quatter Vitgs
Vierwaldstättersee Lai dals Quatter Chantuns
Vorderrhein Rain anteriur
Waldstätten-[hist. Canton] Forestas
Weissenstein [am Albula] Crap Alv (hist.)
Weissenstein [Valsertal] Crap Combras
Weissensteinhorn Crap Surcombras
Weisstannental Val d'Aviez (hist.)
Welschtobel Igl Cuolm
Zervreilatal Val Zervreila

United Kingdom

See also

List of European exonyms

References

Lists of exonyms
Romansh language